Ocean Fast Ferries, Inc. is a wholly owned Filipino corporation that operates high-speed crafts commonly known as OceanJet, serving destinations in the Visayas, Luzon region in the Philippines.

History 
The company started in the late 1990s as Socor Shipping Line, operating one vessel, the M/V Oceanjet 1. The company was not aggressive to expansion until 2001, when the company acquired their second vessel, M/V Oceanjet 2. In the same year, the company changed their name into Ocean Fast Ferries Corporation. They acquired 3 new ships from 2001 to 2003: the sister ships Oceanjet 3, Oceanjet 5 and Oceanjet 6, all built in Hong Kong.

Starting 2011, the company continued their expansion, with the arrival of Ocean Jet 8 into service. She was the first among the ships acquired by the company to be designed by Global Marine Design, based in Australia, who manufactured the marine kits of these ships, which were later assembled here in the Philippines by Golden Dragon Shipyard, located in Mandaue, Cebu.

As of August 2022, the company is serving 11 destinations, and has a fleet of 17 vessels.

Destinations 
The company serves 11 different destinations, namely:
 Bacolod, Negros Occidental
 Batangas City, Batangas
 Calapan, Oriental Mindoro
 Camotes Island, Cebu
 Cebu City, Cebu
 Dumaguete, Negros Oriental
 Getafe, Bohol
 Iloilo City, Iloilo
 Ormoc, Leyte
 Larena, Siquijor
 Tagbilaran, Bohol

Routes 
Oceanjet presently operates in the following routes:
 Cebu-Ormoc & Vice Versa
 Cebu-Tagbilaran-Dumaguete-Larena, Siquijor & Vice Versa
 Cebu-Getafe & Vice Versa 
 Dumaguete-Siquijor & Vice Versa 
 Cebu-Camotes & Vice Versa
 Bacolod-Iloilo & Vice Versa
 Batangas-Calapan & Vice Versa

Fleet 
The company operates a total of 17 vessels, a mix of monohulls and catamarans, making them the largest operator of high-speed crafts in the Visayas region.

References

External links 
 

Companies based in Cebu City
Shipping companies of the Philippines